Digi Sport was a Hungarian sports television network that was launched on 23 July 2009, available only on the Digi TV platform. It is offered as a set of three channels, called Digi Sport 1, Digi Sport 2, Digi Sport 3.

On 2nd August 2019, the redesigned 2012 logo began to be used on air and the current font is the Roboto typeface. Later it got adopted to the Romanian version, but it was adopted to the Hungarian version a few months later. The outros, screen-bug and the idents have been modified.

In June 2022, Digi Hungary owner 4iG publicly announced that they will close down their channels, with Digi Sport being the first to shut down on August 5, and the rest of the channels on September 1st.

Competitions broadcast

Football

Serie A (until 2021) 
Ligue 1 (until 2021)
UEFA Europa League (until 2021) 
UEFA Europa Conference League (until 2022)
Premier League (until 2022) (shared with Spíler Tv) 
Turkish Süper Lig (until 2019)
Copa del Rey

Basketball

EuroLeague (until 2021)

Ice hockey

Erste Bank Liga (until 2019)

Tennis
ATP Finals
ATP Tour Masters 1000 
ATP Tour 500
ATP Tour 250  
WTA Tour

References 

Sports television in Hungary